Gundeberga or Gundeperga, queen of the Lombards, (591-..) was the daughter of Theodelinda and her second husband, the Lombard king Agilulf. She married Arioald, (king of the Lombards; 626-636) and his successor Rothari, (king of the Lombards; 636-652).

As her mother was the daughter of duke Garibald I of Bavaria, Gundeberga is considered part of the Bavarian Dynasty of Lombard royalty. We do not know the exact year of her death, but only that she was buried in Pavia in the church of San Giovanni Domnarum, which she founded.

References

591 births
7th-century Lombard people
Lombardic queens consort
7th-century deaths
6th-century Italian women
Baiuvarii
7th-century Italian women